Events from the year 1897 in Ireland.

Events
 The Irish Motor Car and Cycle Company is established.
 St Kevin's Pauper Lunatic Asylum opens in Cork.

Arts and literature
 26 May – Bram Stoker's novel Dracula is first published, in London.
 13 December – The third Theatre Royal opens in Dublin.
 The first Feis Ceoil musical and cultural festival is organised in Dublin by Dr. Annie Patterson, Edward Martyn and Dr. George Sigerson.
 George Sigerson's translated anthology Bards of the Gael and Gall and his daughter Dora Sigerson Shorter's The Fairy Changeling, and Other Poems are published.
 Amanda McKittrick Ros publishes Irene Iddesleigh.

Sport

Football
International
20 February  England 6–0 Ireland (in Nottingham)
6 March  Ireland 4–3 Wales (in Belfast)
27 March  Scotland 5–1 Ireland (in Glasgow)

Irish League
Winners: Glentoran

Irish Cup
Winners: Cliftonville 3–1 Sherwood Foresters

Births
1 February – Eddie Doyle, Kilkenny hurler (died 1948).
15 January – Mark Killilea Snr, Fianna Fáil TD, member of the Seanad (died 1970).
1 March – Robert Bruce Bowers, cricketer (died 1956).
23 March – John Lighton Synge, mathematician and physicist (died 1995).
4 April – Francis Evans, British diplomat (died 1983).
29 April – Mainie Jellett, abstract painter (died 1944).
26 May – Ernie O'Malley, prominent officer in the Irish Republican Army during the Irish War of Independence and on anti-Treaty side in the Irish Civil War and a writer (died 1957).
10 June – Moss (Maurice) Twomey, chief of staff of the Irish Republican Army (died 1978).
1 July – Tom Barry, guerrilla leader in the Irish Republican Army during the Irish War of Independence (died 1980).
18 August – Enid Starkie, literary critic and biographer (died 1970).
1 September – Andy Kennedy, footballer (died 1963).
17 September – Bob Fullam, soccer player (died 1974).
26 November – Thomas Derrig, Fianna Fáil TD and Cabinet Minister (died 1956).
3 December – Kate O'Brien, novelist (died 1974).
Full date unknown – Ed Reavy, fiddle player and songwriter (died 1988).

Deaths
21 January – Anthony O'Grady Lefroy, government official in Western Australia (born 1816).
24 January – Margaret Wolfe Hungerford, novelist (born 1855).
3 March – Garrett Byrne, Irish nationalist and MP (born 1829).
19 March – Antoine Thomson d'Abbadie, geographer (born 1810).
1 April – William Plunket, 4th Baron Plunket, Church of Ireland Archbishop of Dublin (born 1828).
9 August – William R. Roberts, diplomat, Fenian Society member and United States Representative from New York (born 1830).
11 October – Charles W. Jones, lawyer and United States Senator in Florida (born 1834).
31 October – Samuel Haughton, scientific writer (born 1821).
25 November – John Coleman, United States Marine, recipient of Medal of Honor for his actions in 1871 during the Korean Expedition (born 1847).
8 December – Mary O'Connell, nurse during the American Civil War (born 1814).

References

 
1890s in Ireland
Ireland
Years of the 19th century in Ireland
Ireland